The women's singles of the 2006 ECM Prague Open tournament was played on clay in Prague, Czech Republic. 

Dinara Safina was the defending champion, but competed in Berlin at the same week.

Shahar Pe'er won the title by defeating Samantha Stosur 4–6, 6–2, 6–1 in the final.

Seeds

Draw

Finals

Top half

Bottom half

External Links
 Main and Qualifying Draws

2006 Women's Singles
2006 in Czech women's sport